The 2000 season in Swedish football, starting January 2000 and ending December 2000:

Honours

Official titles

Competitions

Promotions, relegations and qualifications

Promotions

Relegations

International qualifications

Domestic results

Allsvenskan

2000 Allsvenskan qualification play-off

Superettan

1999–2000 Svenska Cupen 
Final

National team results

References 
Print

Online

 
Seasons in Swedish football